Daniel Llambrich Gabriel (born 14 March 1975 in Barcelona) is a vision impaired S12/B2 swimmer from Spain. His job in 2008 was working as a coupon seller.  He competed at the 1996 Summer Paralympics and the 2000 Summer Paralympics, where he did not  medal.  He swam at the 2004 Summer Paralympics, winning a silver medal in the 4 x 100 meter 49 points medley relay. He raced at the 2008 Summer Paralympics.

References

External links 
 
 

Living people
1975 births
Spanish male freestyle swimmers
Spanish male breaststroke swimmers
Swimmers from Barcelona
Swimmers at the 1992 Summer Paralympics
Swimmers at the 1996 Summer Paralympics
Swimmers at the 2000 Summer Paralympics
Swimmers at the 2004 Summer Paralympics
Swimmers at the 2008 Summer Paralympics
Paralympic silver medalists for Spain
Paralympic bronze medalists for Spain
Paralympic medalists in swimming
Medalists at the 1992 Summer Paralympics
Medalists at the 2004 Summer Paralympics
Paralympic swimmers of Spain
S12-classified Paralympic swimmers
Medalists at the World Para Swimming Championships